Jackie Gay (born October 15, 1962) is a Canadian paralympic sailor. Alongside her husband, she won a silver medal at the SKUD 18 – 2 person keelboat during the 2016 Summer Paralympics.

Early life
Gay was born on October 15, 1962. Growing up in South Africa, Gay lost her leg in a landslide with her previous husband in 1994.

Career
Upon moving to Canada and remarrying in 2010, Gay and her second husband John McRoberts sailed with the Royal Victoria Yacht Club and qualified for the 2016 Summer Paralympics. During the 2016 Summer Paralympics, Gay and McRoberts won a silver medal at the SKUD 18 – 2 person keelboat. In recognition of their efforts, the couple was the recipient of the Rolex Sailor of the Year and Sail Canada Sailor of the Month.

References

External links
 
 

Living people
1962 births
Paralympic silver medalists for Canada
Medalists at the 2016 Summer Paralympics
Sailors at the 2016 Summer Paralympics
Canadian female sailors (sport)
Paralympic sailors of Canada
South African emigrants to Canada
Canadian amputees